The Southwest Miramichi River is a river in New Brunswick, Canada.

The river has its origin in Carleton County, at Miramichi Lake in the Miramichi Highlands (a part of the Appalachian Mountains).  Its two branches join near the hamlet of Juniper, Carleton County.  Flowing initially southeast through heavy forests and large hills, the Southwest Miramichi River enters Northumberland County, is joined by the Taxis River at Boiestown then the larger volume flows northeast.  The river is tidal below Renous-Quarryville.  The Southwest Miramichi River joins the Northwest Miramichi River at Newcastle to form the Miramichi River.

The river is noted for Atlantic Salmon fishing.  It is navigable by canoe throughout much of its length. Nearly every bend in the river, for example Push and Be Damned Rapids, has a distinctive name reflecting the importance of the river to fishermen, canoeists, and lumbermen.

It is sometimes referred to as the "Main Southwest Miramichi River" to distinguish it from the Little Southwest Miramichi River, a smaller, more northerly branch of the Miramichi River system. The Mi'kmaq referred to the river as Lustagoocheech, meaning "good little river" for canoeing.

Tributaries
 North Branch Southwest Miramichi River
 South Branch Southwest Miramichi River
 Taxis River
 Cains River
 Bartholomew River
 Renous River
 Barnaby River

See also
List of rivers of New Brunswick

References

Rivers of New Brunswick
Landforms of Northumberland County, New Brunswick